USS Sonoma may refer to the following ships of the United States Navy:

  was a side-wheel gunboat launched in 1862 and sold in 1867.
  was a tug, launched in 1912 and sunk by enemy action in October 1944.
  was also a tug, commissioned in 1944 and decommissioned in 1946.

United States Navy ship names